Marques Kevin Johnson (born February 8, 1956) is an American former professional basketball player who is a basketball analyst for the Milwaukee Bucks on Bally Sports Wisconsin. He played as a small forward in the National Basketball Association (NBA) from 1977 to 1989, where he was a five-time All-Star. He played the majority of his career with the Bucks.

Johnson was a Los Angeles City Section player of the year in high school before attending the University of California, Los Angeles (UCLA). He played college basketball for the UCLA Bruins and won a national championship in 1975. In his senior year, he won multiple national player of the year awards. Johnson was the third overall pick in the 1977 NBA draft by the Milwaukee Bucks. He played seven seasons with Milwaukee before finishing his NBA career with the Los Angeles Clippers and the Golden State Warriors.

Early life
Johnson was born in Natchitoches, Louisiana and raised in South Los Angeles, where he played high school basketball at Crenshaw High School in Crenshaw, Los Angeles, winning the Los Angeles City Section 4-A Division Player of the Year in 1973.

College career
He later attended UCLA, and became an All-American player on its basketball teams, under Coach John Wooden and coach Gene Bartow.

In his sophomore season in 1974–75, Johnson helped to lead the Bruins to Coach John Wooden's 10th and final NCAA Division I men's basketball championship. Wooden retired from coaching after the season, and Gene Bartow became the head coach. Johnson continued to excel, earning the first of his two first-team All-Pac-8 selections as a junior in 1976. He averaged 21.1 points and 11.1 rebounds per game in his senior season and won the inaugural John R. Wooden Award in addition to the USBWA College Player of the Year as the nation's top collegiate basketball player. Johnson also majored in Theater Arts at UCLA. The Bruins retired his No. 54 jersey in 1996.

Professional career

Milwaukee Bucks (1977–1984)
Johnson was selected third overall in the 1977 NBA draft by the Milwaukee Bucks, coached by Don Nelson. Johnson averaged 19.5 points per game and 10.6 rebounds per game in his first professional season, and was named to the 1978 NBA All-Rookie Team.

In his second season in 1978–79, Johnson was the NBA's third leading scorer (25.6 PPG), behind George Gervin (29.6) and Lloyd Free (28.8). He played in the 1979 NBA All-Star Game and was named to the All-NBA First Team. That season, in what was perhaps one of the best games of his career, on December 12, 1978, Johnson scored 40 points (on a remarkable 74% shooting percentage) and grabbed 12 rebounds in a 120–114 win against the Phoenix Suns. However, despite having the 6th highest offensive efficiency rating and 13th highest defensive rating of any team, the Bucks would miss the playoffs with a 38–44 record. It would be the last time the Bucks missed the playoffs during Johnson's tenure.

The following season, on February 27, 1980, Johnson recorded a triple double with 25 points, 11 rebounds, and 11 assists in a 119–110 victory against the Phoenix Suns. During that year's playoffs, Johnson averaged 19.9 points and 6.9 rebounds in 43.7 minutes a game, in a tightly contested 7-game series loss to the Seattle SuperSonics (it was the last season Milwaukee was in the Western Conference).

On November 2, 1980, Johnson scored 40 points, along with 7 rebounds and 7 assists, to lead the Bucks to a 135–121 victory against the Indiana Pacers. The feat was especially impressive as key teammates Junior Bridgeman and Sidney Moncrief were limited with injuries.

On May 2, 1983, in Game 4 of the Eastern Conference Semifinals, Johnson scored 33 points and grabbed 9 rebounds to lead the Bucks to a 4–0 sweep of Larry Bird and the Boston Celtics. Despite this, the Bucks would fall to the eventual champion Philadelphia 76ers, led by NBA MVP Moses Malone, during the next round in 5 games, in what were contested matchups. It was the only series Philadelphia did not win in 4 games that postseason.

Johnson claims to have coined the term point forward, a position he played out of necessity in 1984. During the 1984 playoffs, Milwaukee became short on point guards due to injuries. Nelson instructed Johnson to set up the offense from his forward position. Johnson responded, "OK, so instead of a point guard, I'm a point forward".

Johnson helped lead Milwaukee to several division titles (1980, 1981, 1982, 1983, 1984). Johnson and the Bucks reached as far as the Eastern Conference Finals twice, in 1983 and again in 1984.

While on the Bucks, both Johnson and teammate Mickey Johnson were the first two players in NBA history to have their full first and last names displayed on their jerseys, as they both shared the same first initial and last name.

When asked about his favorite experience on the Bucks upon the announcement of his jersey being retired in 2019, Johnson said “It was a compilation of everything. It was getting there in 1977, 21 years old out of L.A., stars in my eyes, and thoughts of being a great NBA player was my goal. And winning a championship in Milwaukee. But what happened was, I come to Milwaukee, and we’ve got this nucleus of just great young talent from all sorts of solid programs: myself and Dave Meyers from UCLA; and Junior Bridgeman from Louisville; Quinn Buckner, who we lost to twice in ’76 on that great Indiana team with Kent Benson; Brian Winters from South Carolina. So this great youth movement in Milwaukee with an opportunity to build and grow together.”

Los Angeles Clippers (1984–1987)
In the 1984 off-season, Nelson – who was also Bucks general manager – traded Johnson, forward-guard Junior Bridgeman, forward Harvey Catchings and cash to the Los Angeles Clippers in exchange for forward Terry Cummings, and guards Craig Hodges and Ricky Pierce. This was a homecoming for Johnson, as he grew up and attended high school just a few miles from the Clippers' home at Los Angeles Memorial Sports Arena. In his first season with the Clippers in 1984–85, he had career lows in scoring and shooting. They moved him to guard in 1985–86, and he bounced back with an all-star season and was named the NBA Comeback Player of the Year.

The Clippers struggled to win. Johnson later said that playing for those losing Clippers teams "kind of wore you down and made you feel like you were kind of the JV team in Los Angeles." Being named the team captain by head coach Don Chaney, a fellow Louisianan, was one of the few things that kept him from demanding a trade. During a game in the 1986–87 season, Johnson suffered a neck injury, which effectively ended his career.

Golden State Warriors (1989)
Johnson made a brief comeback during the 1989–90 season, playing only 10 games with the Warriors before retiring on December 27, 1989.

Personal life
Johnson has five sons, Kris, Josiah, Joshua, Moriah and Cyrus.

Kris, like his father, played basketball at Crenshaw High and UCLA. Johnson and Kris are the first father–son combo to be honored as Los Angeles City Section 4-A Player of the Year. They are also one of four father-son duos to each win an NCAA basketball championship and the only ones to accomplish it at the same school.

Josiah also played basketball at UCLA, but later helped create the Comedy Central show, The Legends of Chamberlain Heights.

Josh played college basketball at Western Oregon State University.

Moriah played basketball at Tuskegee University and is an actor on the BET's Baldwin Hills.

Johnson also has two daughters. Jasmine is an accomplished tennis player and Shiloh excels at golf and swimming.

Johnson's child, Marques Kevin Johnson Jr., was 15-months-old when he fell into the family swimming pool on May 15, 1987, and drowned.

During his early playing career, Johnson suffered with substance abuse issues. While on the Bucks, in 1982, Johnson was treated for cocaine addiction at a drug rehabilitation facility.

Looking back on his transition from comparatively warm-weather southern California to Wisconsin upon being drafted, Johnson said “My first year — and I may get this conflated — but the first year was more snow than they’d had in 25 years. It was just snow, snow, snow until May, and then my second year was the coldest that it had been in 30 years… And everybody kept telling me that ‘This is really extreme. It’s bad, but it’s not really this bad.’ And you couldn't have told me different.”

Media career
As his playing career ended, Johnson got into the entertainment business, as he acted in small roles in many films, including White Men Can't Jump, Love and Action in Chicago, Blue Chips, and Forget Paris. Johnson is still actively enhancing his creative roots, writing screenplays and short stories. His role in the aforementioned White Men Can't Jump as Raymond was praised, and Johnson claims fans still regularly quote the movie to him if they recognize him in public.

Johnson was the early morning show co-host on the Clippers' flagship radio station, KFWB-AM in Los Angeles.

Johnson served a color analyst for the Seattle SuperSonics in the late 1990s. He was nationally on Fox Sports and Fox Sports 1 as a basketball analyst.

Since 2015, Johnson has worked as both a full-time and part-time analyst for Milwaukee Bucks telecasts on Fox Sports Wisconsin.

Awards and honors
 The Milwaukee Bucks retired Johnson's No. 8 jersey on March 24, 2019.
 The Bruins retired his No. 54 jersey in 1996.
 In 2013, Johnson was inducted into the College Basketball Hall of Fame.
 In 2019, Johnson was inducted into the California Sports Hall of Fame.
 In 2019, Johnson was inducted into the Wisconsin Athletic Hall of Fame.
 5× NBA All-Star (–)
 All-NBA First Team
 2× All-NBA Second Team (–)
 NBA All-Rookie First Team
 NCAA champion (1975)
 Naismith College Player of the Year (1977)
 John R. Wooden Award (1977)
 USBWA Player of the Year (1977)
 Adolph Rupp Trophy (1977)
 NABC Player of the Year (1977)
 AP College Player of the Year (1977)
 UPI College Basketball of the Year (1977)
 Helms Foundation Player of the Year (1977)
 Sporting News Player of the Year (1977)
 Pac-10 Player of the Year (1977)
 Consensus first team All-American (1977)
 Pac-10 Hall of Honor

NBA career statistics

Regular season

|-
| style="text-align:left;"|
| style="text-align:left;"|Milwaukee
| 80 ||  || 34.6 || .522 ||  || .736 || 10.6 || 2.4 || 1.2 || 1.3 || 19.5
|-
| style="text-align:left;"|
| style="text-align:left;"|Milwaukee
| 77 ||  || 36.1 || .550 ||  || .760 || 7.6 || 3.0 || 1.5 || 1.2 || 25.6
|-
| style="text-align:left;"|
| style="text-align:left;"|Milwaukee
| 77 ||  || 34.9 || .544 || .222 || .791 || 7.4 || 3.5 || 1.3 || .9 || 21.7
|-
| style="text-align:left;"|
| style="text-align:left;"|Milwaukee
| 76 ||  || 33.4 || .552 || .000 || .706 || 6.8 || 4.6 || 1.5 || .5 || 20.3
|-
| style="text-align:left;"|
| style="text-align:left;"|Milwaukee
| 60 || 52 || 31.7 || .532 || .000 || .700 || 6.1 || 3.6 || 1.0 || .6 || 16.5
|-
| style="text-align:left;"|
| style="text-align:left;"|Milwaukee
| 80 || 80 || 35.7 || .509 || .200 || .735 || 7.0 || 4.5 || 1.3 || .7 || 21.4
|-
| style="text-align:left;"|
| style="text-align:left;"|Milwaukee
| 74 || 74 || 36.7 || .502 || .154 || .709 || 6.5 || 4.3 || 1.6 || .6 || 20.7
|-
| style="text-align:left;"|
| style="text-align:left;"|L.A. Clippers
| 72 || 68 || 34.0 || .452 || .231 || .731 || 5.9 || 3.4 || 1.0 || .4 || 16.4
|-
| style="text-align:left;"|
| style="text-align:left;"|L.A. Clippers
| 75 || 75 || 34.7 || .510 || .067 || .760 || 5.5 || 3.8 || 1.4 || .7 || 20.3
|-
| style="text-align:left;"|
| style="text-align:left;"|L.A. Clippers
| 10 || 10 || 30.2 || .439 || .000 || .714 || 3.3 || 2.8 || 1.2 || .5 || 16.6
|-
| style="text-align:left;"|
| style="text-align:left;"|Golden State
| 10 || 0 || 9.9 || .375 || .667 || .824 || 1.7 || .9 || .0 || .1 || 4.0
|- class="sortbottom"
| style="text-align:center;" colspan="2"|Career
| 691 || 359 || 34.3 || .518 || .152 || .739 || 7.0 || 3.6 || 1.3 || .8 || 20.1
|- class="sortbottom"
| style="text-align:center;" colspan="2"|All-Star
| 5 || 2 || 21.2 || .314 ||  || .750 || 3.8 || 1.8 || 0.2 || 0.4 || 6.8

Playoffs

|-
| style="text-align:left;"|1978
| style="text-align:left;"|Milwaukee
| 9 ||  || 35.7 || .549 ||  || .750 || 12.4 || 3.4 || 1.1 || 1.9 || 24.0
|-
| style="text-align:left;"|1980
| style="text-align:left;"|Milwaukee
| 7 ||  || 43.3 || .422 || .333 || .750 || 6.9 || 2.9 || .7 || .9 || 19.9
|-
| style="text-align:left;"|1981
| style="text-align:left;"|Milwaukee
| 7 ||  || 38.0 || .556 || .000 || .719 || 9.4 || 4.9 || 1.4 || 1.0 || 24.7
|-
| style="text-align:left;"|1982
| style="text-align:left;"|Milwaukee
| 6 ||  || 39.2 || .440 || .250 || .571 || 7.3 || 3.3 || 1.0 || .3 || 18.8
|-
| style="text-align:left;"|1983
| style="text-align:left;"|Milwaukee
| 9 ||  || 42.4 || .486 || .000 || .651 || 8.0 || 4.2 || .9 || .8 || 22.0
|-
| style="text-align:left;"|1984
| style="text-align:left;"|Milwaukee
| 16 ||  || 37.8 || .473 || .250 || .722 || 5.3 || 3.4 || 1.1 || .4 || 20.3
|- class="sortbottom"
| style="text-align:center;" colspan="2"|Career
| 54 ||  || 39.1 || .489 || .231 || .701 || 7.9 || 3.7 || 1.0 || .8 || 21.5

Notes

References

External links

 

1956 births
Living people
African-American male actors
African-American basketball players
All-American college men's basketball players
American male film actors
American men's basketball players
Basketball players from Los Angeles
Basketball players from Louisiana
Crenshaw High School alumni
Golden State Warriors players
Los Angeles Clippers players
Milwaukee Bucks announcers
Milwaukee Bucks draft picks
Milwaukee Bucks players
National Basketball Association All-Stars
National Basketball Association players with retired numbers
National Collegiate Basketball Hall of Fame inductees
Seattle SuperSonics announcers
Small forwards
Sportspeople from Natchitoches, Louisiana
UCLA Bruins men's basketball players
21st-century African-American people
20th-century African-American sportspeople